2012 in television may refer to
 2012 in American television for television related events in the United States.
 2012 in Australian television for television related events in Australia.
 2012 in Belgian television for television related events in Belgium.
 2012 in Brazilian television for television related events in Brazil.
 2012 in British television for television related events in Great Britain.
 2012 in Scottish television for television related events in Scotland.
 2012 in Canadian television for television related events in Canada.
 2012 in Croatian television for television related events in Croatia.
 2012 in Danish television for television related events in Denmark.
 2012 in Dutch television for television related events in the Netherlands.
 2012 in Estonian television for television related events in Estonia.
 2012 in French television for television related events in France.
 2012 in German television for television related events in Germany.
 2012 in Hong Kong television for television related events in Hong Kong.
 2012 in Irish television for television related events in Ireland.
 2012 in Italian television for television related events in Italy.
 2012 in Japanese television for television related events in Japan.
 2012 in Mexican television for television related events in Mexico.
 2012 in New Zealand television for television related events in New Zealand.
 2012 in Norwegian television for television related events in Norway.
 2012 in Pakistani television for television related events in Pakistan.
 2012 in Philippine television for television related events in the Philippines.
 2012 in Polish television for television related events in Poland.
 2012 in Portuguese television for television related events in Portugal.
 2012 in South African television for television related events in South Africa.
 2012 in Spanish television for television related events in Spain.
 2012 in Swedish television for television related events in Sweden.
 2012 in Turkish television for television related events in Turkey.

 
Mass media timelines by year